Kristiāns Rubīns (born 11 December 1997) is a Latvian professional ice hockey defenceman for the Calgary Wranglers of the American Hockey League (AHL) as a prospect under contract to the Calgary Flames of the National Hockey League (NHL).

Playing career
Rubīns played for Latvian and Swedish junior clubs, making his professional debut with VIK Västerås HK in the HockeyAllsvenskan before moving to Canada to play for the Medicine Hat Tigers of the Western Hockey League (WHL). On 3 August 2018, he left junior hockey, signing a professional contract with the Newfoundland Growlers of the ECHL, an affiliate of the Toronto Maple Leafs.

During the 2019–20 season, Rubīns, having signed an AHL contract extension with the Toronto Marlies, remained with the club for the duration of the campaign, posting two goals and 14 points in 47 games before the season was cancelled due to COVID-19.

On 2 April 2020, Rubīns was signed as an undrafted free agent to a two-year, entry-level contract with the Toronto Maple Leafs. Rubīns made his NHL debut on 7 December 2021, a 5–4 win over the Columbus Blue Jackets.

At the conclusion of his NHL debut season, Rubīns was not extended a qualifying offer by the Maple Leafs to retain his exclusive playing rights, and he was subsequently released to unrestricted free agency. On 13 July 2022, the opening day of free agency, Rubīns signed as a free agent with the Ottawa Senators to a one-year, $750,000 contract. In the 2022–23 season, Rubīns contributed with two goals and six points through 42 games with Ottawa's AHL affiliate, the Belleville Senators. 

On 10 March 2023, Rubīns was traded by Ottawa to the Calgary Flames in exchange for future considerations. Upon joining the Flames, Rubīns was immediately assigned to the Calgary Wranglers, the team's AHL affiliate.

International play
Rubīns represented Latvia through the junior level. He was selected by Bob Hartley for Latvia's roster in the 2018 IIHF World Championship. He made his debut in the opening game against Norway. Rubīns was selected to represent the Latvian national team in the 2022 Winter Olympics, but did not play for them when the NHL announced that its players would not be permitted to participate in the 2022 Winter Olympics.

Career statistics

Regular season and playoffs

International

Awards and honours

References

External links
 

1997 births
Living people
Belleville Senators players
Expatriate ice hockey players in Canada
Expatriate ice hockey players in Denmark
Expatriate ice hockey players in Sweden
Frederikshavn White Hawks players
Ice hockey people from Riga
Latvian expatriate ice hockey people
Latvian expatriate sportspeople in Canada
Latvian expatriate sportspeople in Denmark
Latvian expatriate sportspeople in Sweden
Latvian ice hockey defencemen
Medicine Hat Tigers players
Newfoundland Growlers players
Toronto Maple Leafs players
Toronto Marlies players
Undrafted National Hockey League players
VIK Västerås HK players